Asher Hassin (7 July 1918 – 27 March 1995) was an Israeli politician who served as a member of the Knesset for Mapai and its successors between 1959 and 1969.

Biography
Born in Casablanca in Morocco, Hassin attended a teachers seminary and worked as a Hebrew teacher, chairing the country's Hebrew Teachers Association and the Casablanca Hebrew Club. He was also amongst the leadership of the Zionist Federation of Morocco and edited the HaAviv newspaper.

In 1948 he made aliyah to Israel. He joined Mapai, and was elected to the Knesset on the party's list in 1959, and was re-elected in 1961 and 1965. He lost his seat in the 
1969 elections.

He died in 1995 at the age of 76.

External links
 

1918 births
1995 deaths
20th-century Moroccan Jews
People from Casablanca
Moroccan educators
Moroccan emigrants to Israel
Alignment (Israel) politicians
Mapai politicians
Israeli Labor Party politicians
Israeli people of Moroccan-Jewish descent
Members of the 4th Knesset (1959–1961)
Members of the 5th Knesset (1961–1965)
Members of the 6th Knesset (1965–1969)